Friedebert Tuglas, born Friedebert Mihkelson or Michelson (2 March 1886 – 15 April 1971) was an Estonian writer and critic who introduced Impressionism and Symbolism to Estonian literature. Persecuted by the authorities in the beginning of 20th century, he later became an acknowledged representative of Estonian literature in the Soviet era.

Biography
Tuglas was born in Ahja, the son of a carpenter, and studied at the Hugo Treffner Gymnasium from 1904 to 1905. After imprisonment for revolutionary activities, he went into exile in 1906, living in Finland, Germany, Belgium, Switzerland and France, before returning to Estonia in time for the February revolution of 1917.

His most famous short story is Popi ja Huhuu. He was the member of the Siuru literary group and leader of Estonian literary group Young Estonia (Noor-Eesti) in the beginning of 20th century. He was one of the founders of the Estonian Writers' Union and served as its chairman in 1922, 1925–1927 and 1937–1939.

Tuglas was granted the title of People's Writer of the Estonian SSR in 1946. The same year he was elected a corresponding member of the Soviet Estonian Academy of Sciences. He subsequently fell into disfavor, officially blacklisted, deprived of his civil rights and excluded from membership in all institutions, including the Writers’ Union, from which he was expelled in 1950.

Tuglas died in Tallinn in 1971, aged 85, not long after completing his memoirs, acknowledged as a major work in the writer's life. A museum commemorating his life was opened in Tallinn the same year. A short story prize commemorating Tuglas was established in 1971.

A selection of Tuglas' stories is available in English entitled The Poet and the Idiot and Other Stories (Central European University Press, Budapest & New York, 2007, translated by Eric Dickens). A number of Tuglas' other stories were translated into English during Soviet times.

See also
 Friedebert Tuglas short story award

References

External links
 Friedebert Tuglas Short Story Award
 Friedebert Tuglas Museum in Tallinn

1886 births
1971 deaths
People from Põlva Parish
People from the Governorate of Livonia
Estonian male short story writers
Soviet literary historians
Soviet male writers
20th-century male writers
20th-century short story writers
Hugo Treffner Gymnasium alumni
Academic staff of the University of Tartu
Members of the Estonian Academy of Sciences
People's Writers of the Estonian SSR
Burials at Metsakalmistu
Estonian literary critics
Estonian editors
Looming (magazine) editors
Estonian essayists